Julia Grabher (born 2 July 1996) is an Austrian tennis player.

Grabher has won one singles title on the WTA Challenger Tour, along with eleven singles and eight doubles titles on the ITF Women's Circuit. On 26 December 2022, she reached her best singles ranking of world No. 82. On 29 August 2016, she peaked at No. 387 in the doubles rankings.

Playing for Austria Fed Cup team, Grabher has a win–loss record of 6–9 in singles and 2–9 in doubles (overall 8–18).

Professional career

2019-20: WTA Tour debut
In October, Grabher was given a wildcard for the main draw of the 2019 Ladies Linz. She lost in the first round to Slovak player Viktória Kužmová, in straight sets.

Grabher failed in qualifying for the main draw of the 2020 Australian Open.

2022: First WTA 125 title and top 100 debut
In September, Grabher won her maiden title at a WTA 125 event when she defeated Italian player Nuria Brancaccio in Bari, Italy, in straight sets. As a result she reached the top 100 in the rankings at No. 97 on 12 September 2022. Only three weeks later, as the top seed, she would beat Aliona Bolsova and win the final of the $60k Open de San Sebastián in Spain, her third ITF title for 2022.

2023: Grand Slam debut at the Australian Open
She made her debut at the 2023 Australian Open.

Performance timeline

Singles
Current after the 2023 Dubai Open.

WTA 125 tournament finals

Singles: 1 (title)

ITF Circuit finals

Singles: 24 (11 titles, 13 runner–ups)

Doubles: 11 (8 titles, 3 runner–ups)

Notes

References

External links
 
 
 

1996 births
Living people
People from Dornbirn
Austrian female tennis players
Sportspeople from Vorarlberg